Darlyne Chauve is an artist working with paint (especially known for her large works), photography, and video installations. Has a studio, Warehouse NOW, at 745 NW 54 Street in the Liberty City neighborhood of Miami, FL. Also works part of the year in a studio in Mandelieu-la-Napoule, France. Has held exhibitions in the U.S. and France, and has commissioned many works for restaurants, corporations, and private citizens. Darlyne Chauve has taken a part in Miami's Art Basil in the past and is slated to take part in the 2006 Miami Art Basel as well.

External links 
 Darlyne Chauve's official website
 Gallery of some of Chauve's works
 Henry Whorton's official website
 Website featuring works from various surrealist artists

Living people
21st-century American painters
American photographers
American video artists
Year of birth missing (living people)
American women painters
21st-century American women artists
American contemporary painters